HS3 or HS-3 may refer to:

Transport
 Curtiss HS-3, a patrol flying boat built for the United States Navy during World War I
 Helicopter Antisubmarine Squadron 3, a United States Navy unit renamed to HSC-9 in 2009 (Helicopter Sea Combat Squadron 9)
 High Speed 3: a proposal to improve rail links in northern England now called Northern Powerhouse Rail

Other uses
 HS3, a part of the British HS postcode area
 2008 HS3, an asteroid